Kajal Pisal is an Indian television actress who works in Hindi shows.

Career

2007–2014
Pisal began her acting television career in 2007 when Ekta Kapoor gave her a minor part in Kuchh Is Tara, and next played episodic roles in Savdhaan India, CID and Adaalat. In 2011, she bagged the role of Ishika in Kapoor's successful daily soap Bade Achhe Lagte Hain. It was her first big breakthrough, followed by portraying Riya Malik in Ek Hazaaron Mein Meri Behna Hai opposite Karan Suchak. She also appeared as Maya in Ek Mutthi Aasmaan.

2015–present

In 2015, Pisal got further recognition by portraying the negative role of Mansi Raheja in Rashmi Sharma's longest-running television series Saath Nibhaana Saathiya. She next replaced Kishwer Merchant Rai as Neeta Malhotra in Sharma's medical romantic drama Savitri Devi College & Hospital in 2017. In 2018, she had a brief role in Udaan as Kanchan Bedi.

In 2020, Pisal bagged a cameo as Adhira Mathur in Kapoor's supernatural thriller Naagin 5 and starred as Ketki Aneja in Durga – Mata Ki Chhaya. In November 2021, she was cast as Asha Oberoi in Sharma's romantic drama series Sirf Tum.

Television

References

External links
 
 

Indian television actresses
Living people
21st-century Indian actresses
Actresses in Hindi television
Actresses from Mumbai
Gujarati people
People from Mumbai
Year of birth missing (living people)